is a Japanese adult horror visual novel released on July 26, 1996, by Leaf.

Story
Koichi Kashiwagi, a college student, goes to his cousins' for his father's funeral. After the ceremony, as he is on summer vacation, he stays with them. He experiences recurring nightmares and must hold down a strong homicidal impulse surfacing from deep within himself. One day Koichi dreams that he slaughters a person violently. The next day, the news reports the event of a violent homicide in the park where Koichi committed the murder in his dream...

Characters

Chizuru is one of the 13 playable characters in Aquapazza: Aquaplus Dream Match, a fighting game developed by Aquaplus with characters from various Leaf games.

Cast

References

External links
 Official website 
 

1996 video games
Bishōjo games
Horror video games
Japan-exclusive video games
Leaf (Japanese company) games
Single-player video games
Video games developed in Japan
Visual novels
Windows games
Windows-only games
Aquaplus games